Humberto A. Sánchez (born May 28, 1983) is a Dominican minor league pitching coach and former professional baseball pitcher in Major League Baseball (MLB) and the Chinese Professional Baseball League (CPBL). He threw a fastball in the low to mid 90s (90 mph, approximately 145 km/h), as well as a low 90s slider, a curveball, and a changeup.

Early life and amateur career
Sánchez was born in the Dominican Republic and moved to New York City when he was 10 in 1994. He was selected by the Los Angeles Dodgers in the ninth round of the 2000 MLB Draft out of South Bronx High School in The Bronx. Sánchez had expected to be picked as high as the third round and declined the Dodgers' offer of $140,000, opting instead to play college baseball at Rockland Community College in Suffern, New York. Sánchez was limited to one inning pitched at Rockland due to elbow issues but was selected in the 31st round of the 2001 MLB Draft by the Detroit Tigers nonetheless as a "draft and follow" candidate.

Playing career
After posting an 8–1 record at Connors State College in Oklahoma, and winning NJCAA Region II Pitcher of the Year in 2002, Sánchez signed for a bonus of $1 million, and began pitching in the Tigers minor league system in 2002. In 2003, he was named to the Midwest League’s mid-season all-star team. He was third in the league and tied for fifth in the minors with 78 walks. In 2004, Sánchez was promoted to the Double-A Erie SeaWolves. He was second in the Florida State League with three complete games. Sánchez was named the fifth best prospect in the Detroit organization following the season by Baseball America. He pitched for Mesa in the Arizona Fall League following the 2005 season, posting a 1–0 record and 2.15 ERA in six starts. He was named the sixth best prospect in the Detroit organization following the season by Baseball America.

In 2006, splitting time between Double-A and Triple-A, Sánchez struck out 129 batters in 123 innings, while giving up only 97 hits. It was the third year in a row in which he struck out at least a batter an inning. He was the starting pitcher for the World Team at the All-Star Futures Game. He also earned International League Pitcher of the Week honors.

New York Yankees
By 2006, Sánchez had become recognized as one of the best pitching prospects in the game, and on November 10, 2006, the Tigers traded Sánchez, along with minor league pitchers Anthony Claggett and Kevin Whelan, to the New York Yankees for slugger Gary Sheffield. Sánchez underwent Tommy John surgery in the spring of 2007, sidelining him until the 2008 season. On September 15, 2008, Sánchez was called up by the Yankees, and he made his major league debut three days later in relief against the Chicago White Sox. He struck out one batter, Paul Phillips, the first batter he faced in MLB. With the Yankees, Sánchez made two one-inning appearances, allowing one run (4.50 ERA). Sánchez was released by the Yankees on April 25, 2009 to make room on the roster for Mark Melancon, but was re-signed to a minor league deal with the organization on May 5. On November 9, 2009, he was released again by the Yankees.

Late career
In 2010, Sánchez joined La New Bears, a Taiwanese professional baseball club in the Chinese Professional Baseball League. Sánchez last played professionally during the 2011 and 2012 seasons for the Camden Riversharks of the independent Atlantic League of Professional Baseball.

Post-playing career
In the 2018 season, Sánchez was hired as a pitching coach for the Dominican Summer League Red Sox.

References

Further reading

External links

1983 births
Living people
Camden Riversharks players
Connors State Cowboys baseball players
Dominican Republic expatriate baseball players in Mexico
Dominican Republic expatriate baseball players in Taiwan
Dominican Republic expatriate baseball players in the United States
Erie SeaWolves players
Gulf Coast Yankees players
Lakeland Tigers players
La New Bears players
Leones de Yucatán players
Major League Baseball pitchers
Major League Baseball players from the Dominican Republic
Mesa Solar Sox players
Mexican League baseball pitchers
Minor league baseball coaches
New York Yankees players
Oneonta Tigers players
Peoria Javelinas players
Scranton/Wilkes-Barre Yankees players
Sultanes de Monterrey players
Tampa Yankees players
Toledo Mud Hens players
Trenton Thunder players
West Michigan Whitecaps players
Rockland Fighting Hawks baseball players
Dominican Republic emigrants to the United States